Krabat is a 2008 German fantasy film directed by Marco Kreuzpaintner from a screenplay by Michael Gutmann and Kreuzpaintner, based on Otfried Preußler's 1971 novel of the same name. The plot is about a boy, Krabat (played by David Kross), who learns black magic from a sorcerer (played by Christian Redl). A DVD-Video encode of the film is distributed in the United Kingdom as Krabat and the Legend of the Satanic Mill.

It premiered in the US at the Seattle International Film Festival in 2009.

Plot
When the Plague sweeps across Europe after the Thirty Years' War a boy named Krabat (David Kross) is left without family, food, or hope. An old Mill Keeper takes him in as an apprentice. There are eleven other boys working at the mill, and Krabat develops a friendship with one of them, a young man named Tonda (Daniel Brühl).
Soon, Krabat learns that the apprentices are also taught dark sorcery by the master, and one of the rituals (during Easter) lead to an excursion to the nearby village Schwarzkollm where Krabat meets a young girl and falls in love with her. There, Tonda also talks to one of the girls; both seem to be in love with each other. Later, Tonda warns Krabat that the master must never know the name of his girl.

One day, while protecting the nearby village from soldiers, Tonda makes an error and his girl's name (Worschula) is revealed to the master. The next day, Worschula turns up in the creek, dead. Krabat mistakenly blames Lyschko, another apprentice. Tonda becomes a recluse and anticipates the end of the year.
Krabat's first Silvester (New Year's Eve) brings to light the true horror of the mill. Every Silvester, one of the boys must be sacrificed so the master may remain young. And so at midnight, Krabat's best friend Tonda is viciously murdered, and when Krabat tries to help him he is stopped by the other boys who tell him that "there is nothing we can do".  Before he dies, Tonda tells Krabat there is another boy in the mill Krabat can confide in. He also tells Krabat to take two sacks of flour to the village.

Krabat is distraught over Tonda's death, but does as he is told. Bringing the sacks of flour to a tree near the village, Krabat once again meets the girl he first met while protecting the village. He is in love, but does not let the girl tell him her name, fearing for her life. Instead, he calls her Kantorka (Choir leader).
During the ritual at Easter night, he goes to the village to meet her, this time along with a boy called Juro who appears to be mentally disabled and not able to learn the trade or properly do magic. When Juro tells Krabat that they must leave and go back to the mill, Krabat insists that he will stay with Kantorka. Juro then uses powerful magic to convince Krabat to come back with him, revealing that he is in truth highly intelligent and powerful, even able to change the weather. Juro promises Krabat that he will help him escape the master, and tells him that his girl must ask for him on Silvester to set him free. 
Krabat tells Kantorka that she must do so, and she agrees and gives Krabat a lock of her hair, telling him to have another boy deliver it to her when the time is right.

When Krabat returns, a series of climactic events are set in motion.

Cast
David Kross as Krabat 
Daniel Brühl as Tonda
Christian Redl as The Master 
Robert Stadlober as Lyschko
Paula Kalenberg as Kantorka 
Hanno Koffler as Juro 
Anna Thalbach as Worschula 
Charly Hübner as Michal 
Moritz Grove as Merten 
Tom Wlaschiha as Hanzo 
Sven Hönig as Andrusch 
Stefan Haschke as Staschko 
David Fischbach as Lobosch 
Daniel Steiner as Petar 
Tom Lass as Kubo 
Daniel Fripath as Kito 
Ionuț Băiaș as Baro 
Mac Steinmeier as Godfather Death 
Carmen Ungureanu as Krabat's Mother
Otto Sander as the narrator (voice only)

Reception
Flickering Myth reviewed the DVD release of the film, in which he wrote: "Krabat has great potential even though the film doesn’t fully realize it. It fails to explore some interesting story elements and is a little slow on pace. However, it focuses really well on the themes of temptation; with the lure of black magic and power, and friendship; with the sense of brotherhood and companionship Krabat experiences. It’s an enjoyable dark fantasy that has a Grimm fairytale-like feel to it and effective performances from the lead actors".

Awards
Krabat was nominated for the Deutscher Filmpreis in 2009 in the categories Best Production Design, Best Music and Best Sound Design.

See also
Krabat – The Sorcerer's Apprentice (1978)

References

External links

2000s fantasy adventure films
German teen fantasy films
German fantasy adventure films
Dark fantasy films
Films based on fairy tales
Films based on fantasy novels
Films based on German novels
Films based on Slavic mythology
Films directed by Marco Kreuzpaintner
Films set in the 17th century
2000s teen fantasy films
2000s German films
2000s German-language films